Aaron Neville Cohen (11 September 1913 – 4 October 1987) was an English first-class cricketer and colonial official.

Cohen was born in British India at Calcutta in September 1913. He was educated in England at Cheltenham College, before going up to Lincoln College, Oxford. While studying at Oxford, he made three appearances in first-class cricket for Oxford University against Worcestershire, a combined Minor Counties cricket team and Leicestershire, all played at Oxford in 1934. He scored 27 runs in his three matches, with a high score of 15 not out. With his leg break bowling, he took 4 wickets at an average of 67.25 and with best figures of 2 for 79.

After graduating from Oxford, he joined the British Colonial Civil Service in British West Africa. He was commissioned as a second lieutenant during the Second World War in the African Colonial Forces. Cohen died at Oxford in October 1987.

References

External links

1913 births
1987 deaths
Alumni of Lincoln College, Oxford
British Army personnel of World War II
English civil servants
English cricketers
Oxford University cricketers
People educated at Cheltenham College
People from Kolkata